The 6th constituency of Yvelines is a French legislative constituency in the Yvelines département.

Description

The 6th constituency of Yvelines consists of the town Saint-Germain-en-Laye and its environs. It also includes the Forest of Saint-Germain-en-Laye which sits within a loop of the Seine.

Like much of Yvelines the seat was staunchly conservative until 2017. Pierre Morange was elected following the death of his predecessor Michel Péricard in 1999.

Historic Representation

Election results

2022

 
 
 
 
 
 
 
|-
| colspan="8" bgcolor="#E9E9E9"|
|-

2017

 
 
 
 
 
|-
| colspan="8" bgcolor="#E9E9E9"|
|-

2012

 
 
 
 
 
 
|-
| colspan="8" bgcolor="#E9E9E9"|
|-

2007

 
 
 
 
 
 
 
|-
| colspan="8" bgcolor="#E9E9E9"|
|-

2002

 
 
 
 
 
 
|-
| colspan="8" bgcolor="#E9E9E9"|
|-

1997

 
 
 
 
 
 
 
 
 
|-
| colspan="8" bgcolor="#E9E9E9"|
|-

Sources
Official results of French elections from 2002: "Résultats électoraux officiels en France" (in French).

6